Pontchardon is a commune in the Orne department in Normandy, north-western France.

See also
Communes of the Orne department

References

Communes of Orne